The Greenbrier Limestone, also known locally as the "Big Lime", is an extensive limestone unit deposited during the Middle Mississippian Epoch (345.3 ± 2.1 – 326.4 ± 1.6 Ma), part of the Carboniferous Period. This rock stratum is present below ground in much of West Virginia and neighboring Kentucky, and extends somewhat into adjacent western Maryland and southwestern Virginia. The name derives from the Greenbrier River in West Virginia.

Greenbrier Limestone is in some places more than 400 feet (120 metres) thick, allowing it to trap large quantities of oil and gas.  Since this carbonate rock erodes quickly in the region's wet climate, outcrops are not prominent and are often quarried.

The Greenbrier Limestone is subdivided into six stratigraphic units. In ascending order, they are Denmar Limestone, Taggard Shale, Pickaway Limestone, Union Limestone, Greenville Shale, and Alderson Limestone.  The limestones in this interval are predominantly skeletal grainstones or packstones.  The Pickaway and especially the Union contain oolitic grainstones.

Numerous solution caves are developed within the Greenbrier Formation.

See also
List of types of limestone
Geology of West Virginia

References
Haught, O.L. (1968), Structural Contour Map on the Greenbrier Limestone in West Virginia; 35 X 38 inch map.

Carboniferous West Virginia
Mississippian United States
Limestone formations of the United States
Geologic formations of West Virginia